Elections to Stevenage Council were held on 3 May 2007. One third of the council was up for election; the seats which were last contested in 2003. The Labour Party stayed in overall control of the council.

After the election, the composition of the council was:
Labour 32
Liberal Democrat 4
Conservative 3

Election result

Ward results

Bandley Hill

Bedwell

Chells

Longmeadow

Manor

Martins Wood

Old Town

Pin Green

Roebuck

St Nicholas

Shephall

Symonds Green

Woodfield

References
2007 Stevenage election result
Ward results

2007
2007 English local elections
2000s in Hertfordshire